Satrokala is a town and commune in Madagascar. It belongs to the district of Ihosy, which is a part of Ihorombe Region. The population of the commune was estimated to be approximately 10,000 in 2001 commune census.

Only primary schooling is available. The majority 70% of the population of the commune are farmers, while an additional 30% receives their livelihood from raising livestock. The most important crops are cassava and peanuts, while other important agricultural products are beans, rice and taro.

References and notes 

Populated places in Ihorombe